Metromedia, Inc. v. San Diego, 453 U.S. 490 (1981), was a United States Supreme Court case in which it was decided that cities could regulate billboards, and that municipal governments could not treat commercial outdoor advertising more harshly than noncommercial messages.

References

External links
 

Metromedia
United States commercial speech case law
1981 in United States case law
History of San Diego
United States Supreme Court cases
United States Supreme Court cases of the Burger Court